Jennifer Condos is an American bass guitarist known primarily for her session and live performance work. She has contributed to the recordings and live performances of many well-known artists.

Biography
Condos was a founding member of the band Tito & Tarantula and remained with it from 1993–1999. She appeared on their first two albums.

In 1986, Condos was a member of the band that backed Fleetwood Mac vocalist Stevie Nicks when she toured in support of her album Rock a Little.

Condos is a member of the Band of Sweethearts, which includes Brad Meinerding (guitar), Eric Heywood (pedal steel guitar), and Jay Bellerose. They frequently accompany Over the Rhine.

Condos has been a member of Ray LaMontagne's touring band with Jay Bellerose, Eric Heywood, and Greg Leisz.

In 2016, Condos worked with Sam Phillips, Jay Bellerose, and Eric Gorfain to record the score of the Gilmore Girls: A Year in the Life series on Netflix.

Discography

As a member of Tito & Tarantula
 1997: Tarantism (Cockroach)
 1999: Hungry Sally & Other Killer Lullabies (Cockroach)

As composer
 1987: Various artists – Back to the Beach (Columbia) – track 3, "Sign of Love" (co-written with Mark Goldenberg)
 1991: Susanna Hoffs – When You're a Boy (Columbia) – track 11, "Made of Stone" (co-written with Susanna Hoffs and David Kahne)

As producer
 2013: Charlie Faye – You Were Fine, You Weren't Even Lonely (Wine And Nut)

Also appears on

1983–1999
 1983: Jess Tolan – Jess Tolan (Thoroughbred)
 1985: Pointer Sisters – Contact (RCA) on track 6, "Bodies And Souls"
 1986: Graham Grace – Shining Knight (Palace)
 1986: Jackson Browne – Lives in the Balance (Asylum)
 1987: Stevie Nicks – Live at Red Rocks DVD (Sony)
 1988: Karla Bonoff – New World (MusicMasters)
 1988: Parthenon Huxley – Sunny Nights (Columbia)
 1990: Tom Borton – Dancing with Tigers (Mesa/Blue Moon)
 1992: E – A Man Called E (Polydor)
 1993: Holly Near – Musical Highlights from the Play Fire in the Rain (Calico Tracks)
 1995: Bruce Springsteen – The Ghost of Tom Joad (Columbia) on track 10, "Across the Border"
 1996: Amy Sky – Cool Rain (BMG)
 1997: Dan Bern – Dan Bern (Work Group)
 1997: Jann Arden – Happy? (A&M)
 1999: Be Five – Trying to Forget (Renaissance)
 1999: Joe Henry – Fuse (Mammoth)
 1999: various artists – Return of the Grievous Angel: A Tribute to Gram Parsons (Almo) on track 11, "A Song for You"

2000–2005
 2000: Teddy Thompson – Teddy Thompson (Virgin)
 2000: Jann Arden – Blood Red Cherry (Universal)
 2001: Ryan Adams – Gold (Lost Highway)
 2001: Glen Phillips – Abulum (Brick Red)
 2001: Whiskeytown – Pneumonia (Lost Highway)
 2003: Albert Lee – Heartbreak Hill (Sugar Hill)
 2003: Eastmountainsouth – Eastmountainsouth (DreamWorks)
 2003: Joe Henry – Tiny Voices (ANTI-)
 2003: Teitur – Poetry & Aeroplanes (Universal)
 2004: Mutual Admiration Society – Mutual Admiration Society (Sugar Hill)
 2004: various artists – Bridget Jones: The Edge of Reason: The Original Soundtrack (Island) on track 18, "Calling"
 2005: Ryan Adams – 29 (Lost Highway) on track 7, "The Sadness"

2007–2009
 2006: Dan Bern – Breathe (Messenger)
 2006: Parthenon Huxley – Mile High Fan (Not Lame)
 2007: The Naked Brothers Band – The Naked Brothers Band (Columbia)
 2007: Patrick Park – Everyone's in Everyone (Curb Appeal)
 2007: various artists – Endless Highway: The Music of The Band (429 Records) on track 9, "Stage Fright"
 2008: Greg Copeland – Diana and James (Inside)
 2008: Rachael Yamagata – Elephants...Teeth Sinking into Heart (Warner Bros.) on track 1–02 "What If I Leave"
 2008: Sam Phillips – Don't Do Anything (Nonesuch)
 2008: Ray La Montagne – Gossip in the Grain (RCA), drums, vocals
 2009: Joe Henry – Blood from Stars (ANTI–)
 2009: Pete Droge and Elaine Summers (as the Droge & Summers Blend) – Volume One (Puzzle Tree)

2010–present
 2010: Rusty Anderson – Born on Earth (Megaforce)
 2010: Ray LaMontagne – God Willin' & the Creek Don't Rise (RCA / Stone Dwarf / RED)
 2011: Catie Curtis – Stretch Limousine on Fire (Compass)
 2011: Jeffrey Foucault – Horse Latitudes (Signature Sounds)
 2011: Sam Phillips Cameras in the Sky
 2011: Sam Phillips – Solid State
 2012: Bettye LaVette – Thankful N' Thoughtful (ANTI–)
 2013: Over the Rhine – Meet Me at the Edge of the World (Great Speckled Dog)
 2013: Sam Phillips Push Any Button (Littlebox)
 2014: Joe Henry – Invisible Hour (Work Song)
 2015: Bony King – Wild Flowers (Pias)
 2015: Jackson Browne – Standing in the Breach (Inside)
 2016: Graham Nash – This Path Tonight (Blue Castle)
 2017: Tift Merritt – Stitch Of The World (Yep Roc)
 2019 : Moya Brennan (with Cormac De Barra) – Timeless

References

External links
 Jen Condos at LinkedIn
 
 
 

Living people
American rock bass guitarists
Women bass guitarists
20th-century American bass guitarists
Year of birth missing (living people)
20th-century women musicians
Tito & Tarantula members